Nukupule Island is an island in Lifuka district, in the Haªapai islands of Tonga.

There are very few animals (if any) on Nukupule Island although it is surrounded by deep water reefs which are home to an abundance of fish. Humpback Whales with their newborn calves visit from July to October.

References

Islands of Tonga
Haʻapai